The Kazan Zoological and Botanical Garden sometimes called the Kazan Zoo, is a mixed garden in Kazan, Russia. It displays over 1,000 and 160 species of plants and animals, respectively. As of 2014, the garden was reconstructed and additional spaces were inserted. In 1996, the garden joined the European Association of Zoos and Aquaria.

See also
List of zoos by country#Russia

References

Cultural heritage monuments of regional significance in Tatarstan
Botanical gardens in Russia
Zoos in Russia
Tourist attractions in Kazan
Buildings and structures in Kazan
1806 establishments in the Russian Empire